The following is a list of professional wrestling attendance records. The list is dominated by the Japanese wrestling promotion New Japan Pro-Wrestling (NJPW) which is the largest organization in the country. NJPW's Collision in Korea, a two-day interpromotional supercard co-hosted with World Championship Wrestling, was the first-ever pro wrestling event held in North Korea and remains the most attended live event of all-time with a combined crowd of 320,000.

The second highest number of shows is held by the U.S.-based World Wrestling Entertainment which has controlled the wrestling industry in North America since 2002. According to this list, 17 events are from WWE's flagship WrestleMania pay-per-view (PPV) event, which since 2007's WrestleMania 23 has (except in 2020) been held exclusively in stadiums that typically have a seating capacity of at least 70,000 people. Excluding WWE live events, there are no attendance records remaining from the "Territory-era" (1940s-1980s) and only one record from the "Pioneer-era" (1900s-1940s). All but thirty-seven of the events have been held in Japan, while twenty-one have been held in the United States, six in Greece, four in Canada, three in Pakistan, two in Australia and one each in Italy, India, Mexico and North Korea.

Events and attendances
Note: Minimum attendance of 40,000.Although many of WWE's attendance records are disputed, for the purpose of this list, WWE's announced attendance figures are shown.

See also
List of professional wrestling attendance records in Europe
List of professional wrestling attendance records in Japan
List of professional wrestling attendance records in Puerto Rico
List of professional wrestling attendance records in the United Kingdom
List of WWE attendance records
List of professional wrestling attendance records in Oceania

Footnotes

References
General

Specific

External links
Cards With Highest Claimed Attendance from The Internet Wrestling Database
Supercards & Tournaments at ProWrestlingHistory.com
World attendance records at Wrestlingdata.com

 
Attendance records